Cerpa may refer to:
 Cerpa Export, Brazilian beer
 Néstor Cerpa Cartolini (1953–1997), Peruvian revolutionary